Morten Sigval Bergesen (born 9 June 1974) is a Norwegian rower. He competed in the men's coxless four event at the 1996 Summer Olympics.

References

1974 births
Living people
Norwegian male rowers
Olympic rowers of Norway
Rowers at the 1996 Summer Olympics
Sportspeople from Stavanger